Blahodatne may refer to several places in Ukraine:

Cherkasy Oblast
Blahodatne, Cherkasy Oblast, village in Zolotonosha Raion

Crimea
Blahodatne, Crimea

Dnipropetrovsk Oblast
Blahodatne, Kamianske Raion, Dnipropetrovsk Oblast
Blahodatne, Kryvyi Rih Raion, Dnipropetrovsk Oblast

Donetsk Oblast
Blahodatne, Bakhmut Raion, Donetsk Oblast
Blahodatne, Amvrosiivka Raion, Donetsk Oblast
Blahodatne, Khartsyzk Municipality, Donetsk Oblast
Blahodatne, Olhynka settlement hromada, Volnovakha Raion, Donetsk Oblast
Blahodatne, Velyka Novosilka settlement hromada, Volnovakha Raion, Donetsk Oblast

Kharkiv Oblast
Blahodatne, Krasnokutsk settlement hromada, Bohodukhiv Raion, Kharkiv Oblast
Blahodatne, Valky urban hromada, Bohodukhiv Raion, Kharkiv Oblast
Blahodatne, Vovchansk urban hromada, Bohodukhiv Raion, Kharkiv Oblast
Blahodatne, Kharkiv Raion, Kharkiv Oblast
Blahodatne, Lozova Raion, Kharkiv Oblast
Blahodatne, Zmiiv urban hromada, Chuhuiv Raion, Kharkiv Oblast

Kherson Oblast
Blahodatne, Beryslav Raion, Kherson Oblast
Blahodatne, Henichesk Raion, Kherson Oblast
Blahodatne, Kakhovka Raion, Kherson Oblast
Blahodatne, Kherson Raion, Kherson Oblast
Blahodatne, Skadovsk Raion, Kherson Oblast

Kirovohrad Oblast
Blahodatne, Hurivka rural hromada, Kropyvnytskyi Raion, Kirovohrad Oblast
Blahodatne, Ketrysanivka rural hromada, Kropyvnytskyi Raion, Kirovohrad Oblast

Luhansk Oblast
Blahodatne, Luhansk Oblast

Mykolaiv Oblast
Blahodatne, Mykolaiv urban hromada, Mykolaiv Raion, Mykolaiv Oblast
Blahodatne, Ochakiv urban hromada, Mykolaiv Raion, Mykolaiv Oblast
Blahodatne, Pervomaisk Raion, Mykolaiv Oblast

Odesa Oblast
Blahodatne, Plakhtiivka rural hromada, Bilhorod-Dnistrovskyi Raion, Odesa Oblast
Blahodatne, Shabo rural hromada, Bilhorod-Dnistrovskyi Raion, Odesa Oblast
Blahodatne, Bolhrad Raion, Odesa Oblast
Blahodatne, Odesa Raion, Odesa Oblast
Blahodatne, Podilsk Raion, Odesa Oblast
Blahodatne, Rozdilna Raion, Odesa Oblast

Vinnytsia Oblast
Blahodatne, Vinnytsia Oblast

Volyn Oblast
Blahodatne, Volyn Oblast